The 2002 FIA Sportscar Championship Spa was the sixth and final race for the 2002 FIA Sportscar Championship season held at Circuit de Spa-Francorchamps, Belgium.  It took place on September 22, 2002.

Although planned to run for two hours and thirty minutes, the race was stopped just shortly after two hours due to torrential downpour.

Official results
Class winners in bold.  Cars failing to complete 75% of winner's distance marked as Not Classified (NC).

Statistics
 Pole Position - #8 Racing For Holland - 2:07.704
 Fastest Lap - #8 Racing For Holland - 2:08.909
 Distance - 376.272 km
 Average Speed - 183.148 km/h

External links
 Race results

S
6 Hours of Spa-Francorchamps
1000km